In geometry, the Dandelin spheres are one or two spheres that are tangent both to a plane and to a cone that intersects the plane. The intersection of the cone and the plane is a conic section, and the point at which either sphere touches the plane is a focus of the conic section, so the Dandelin spheres are also sometimes called focal spheres.

The Dandelin spheres were discovered in 1822.  They are named in honor of the French mathematician Germinal Pierre Dandelin, though Adolphe Quetelet is sometimes given partial credit as well.    

The Dandelin spheres can be used to give elegant modern proofs of two classical theorems known to Apollonius of Perga. The first theorem is that a closed conic section (i.e. an ellipse) is the locus of points such that the sum of the distances to two fixed points (the foci) is constant. The second theorem is that for any conic section, the distance from a fixed point (the focus) is proportional to the distance from a fixed line (the directrix), the constant of proportionality being called the eccentricity.  

A conic section has one Dandelin sphere for each focus. An ellipse has two Dandelin spheres touching the same nappe of the cone, while hyperbola has two Dandelin spheres touching opposite nappes.  A parabola has just one Dandelin sphere.

Proof that the intersection curve has constant sum of distances to foci 

Consider the illustration, depicting a cone with apex S at the top. A plane e intersects the cone in a curve C (with blue interior).  The following proof shall show that the curve C is an ellipse.

The two brown Dandelin spheres, G1 and G2, are placed tangent to both the plane and the cone: G1 above the plane, G2 below.

Denote the point of tangency of the plane with G1 by F1,
and similarly for G2 and F2 .  Let P be a typical point on the curve C.

A line passing through P and the vertex S of the cone intersects the two circles, touching G1 and G2 respectively at points P1 and P2.
As P moves around the curve, P1 and P2 move along the two circles, and their distance d(P1, P2) remains constant.
The distance from P to F1 is the same as the distance from P to P1, because the line segments PF1 and PP1 are both tangent to the same sphere G1.
By a symmetrical argument, the distance from P to F2 is the same as the distance from P to P2.

This gives a different proof of a theorem of Apollonius of Perga.

If we define an ellipse to mean the locus of points P such that d(F1, P) + d(F2, P) = a constant, then the above argument proves that the intersection curve C is indeed an ellipse. That the intersection of the plane with the cone is symmetric about the perpendicular bisector of the line through F1 and F2 may be counterintuitive, but this argument makes it clear.

Adaptations of this argument work for hyperbolas and parabolas as intersections of a plane with a cone.  Another adaptation works for an ellipse realized as the intersection of a plane with a right circular cylinder.

Proof of the focus-directrix property 
The directrix of a conic section can be found using Dandelin's construction.  Each Dandelin sphere intersects the cone at a circle; let both of these circles define their own planes.  The intersections of these two parallel planes with the conic section's plane will be two parallel lines; these lines are the directrices of the conic section. However, a parabola has only one Dandelin sphere, and thus has only one directrix.

Using the Dandelin spheres, it can be proved that any conic section is the locus of points for which the distance from a point (focus) is proportional to the distance from the directrix.  Ancient Greek mathematicians such as Pappus of Alexandria were aware of this property, but the Dandelin spheres facilitate the proof.

Neither Dandelin nor Quetelet used the Dandelin spheres to prove the focus-directrix property.  The first to do so may have been Pierce Morton in 1829,
or perhaps Hugh Hamilton who remarked (in 1758) that a sphere touches the cone at a circle which defines a plane whose intersection with the plane of the conic section is a directrix.  The focus-directrix property can be used to prove that astronomical objects move along conic sections around the Sun.

Notes

External links 

Dandelin Spheres page by Hop David

Math Academy page on Dandelin's spheres
Les théorèmes belges by Xavier Hubaut (in French).
Conic Section Orbits-Dandelin spheres by Egan greg

Conic sections
Euclidean solid geometry
Spheres